Touwu Township is a rural township in north-western Miaoli County, Taiwan.

Geography
Area: 
Population: 9,941 (January 2023)

Administrative divisions
The township comprises eight villages: Beikeng, Feifeng, Mingde, Mingfeng, Qudong, Shitan, Touwu and Xiangshan.

Politics
The township is part of Miaoli County Constituency II electoral district for Legislative Yuan.

Tourist attractions
 Guanyin Temple
 Mingde Reservoir behind Mingde Dam
 Rihsin Island

Notable natives
 Chang Chiu-hua, Magistrate of Miaoli County (1989–1993)
 Rai Hau-min, President of Judicial Yuan (2010–2016)

References

External links

 

Townships in Miaoli County